Sudbury was a parliamentary constituency which was represented in the House of Commons of the Parliament of the United Kingdom.

History
A parliamentary borough consisting of the town of Sudbury in Suffolk, the constituency returned two Members of Parliament (MPs) from 1559 until it was disenfranchised for corruption in 1844, after which it was absorbed into the Western Division of Suffolk.  It was probably enfranchised through lobbying from Ambrose Cave the Chancellor of the Duchy of Lancaster who had interests in the area and could influence the choice of MPs.  Sudbury had in the eighteenth Century been seen as a particularly expensive seat but not under the influence of any patron and in the 1761 general election Horace Walpole the cousin of the outgoing MP, Thomas Walpole, had claimed that Sudbury had openly advertised itself for sale with the new MP, John Henniker having to spend £5,500 from the Duke of Newcastle's funds. but not under the influence of any patron The Sudbury election of 1835, which Charles Dickens reported for the Morning Chronicle, is thought by many experts to be the inspiration for the famous Eatanswill election in his novel Pickwick Papers.

It was re-established as one of five single-member county divisions of the Parliamentary County of Suffolk by the Redistribution of Seats Act 1885 for the 1885 general election, electing one MP by the first past the post voting system. It was abolished for the 1950 general election.

Boundaries and boundary changes
1885–1918: The part of the Municipal Borough of Sudbury in the county of Suffolk, the Sessional Divisions of Boxford, Cosford, Melford, and Risbridge, and parts of the Sessional Divisions of Newmarket, and Thingoe and Thedwestry.

The county division was formed from part of the abolished Western Division, including Sudbury, Hadleigh and Haverhill.

1918–1950: The Municipal Borough of Sudbury, the Urban Districts of Glemsford, Hadleigh, and Haverhill, the Rural Districts of Clare, Cosford, and Melford, and parts of the Rural Districts of Moulton and Thingoe.

Marginal changes to boundaries.

On abolition, western and northern parts, including Haverhill, transferred to Bury St Edmunds.  Central, southern and western parts, including Sudbury and Hadleigh, formed part of the new county constituency of Sudbury and Woodbridge.

Members of Parliament

MPs 1559–1640

MPs 1640–1844

MPs 1885–1950

Elections

Elections in the 1830s

Taylor's death caused a by-election.

 Both candidates received the same number of votes, but the mayor's vote was added in favour of Barnes

Hamilton's resignation caused a by-election.

Barnes' death caused a by-election.

Elections in the 1840s
Walsh resigned by accepting the office of Steward of the Chiltern Hundreds in order to contest a by-election at Radnorshire, causing a by-election.

After an election petition was lodged, a Royal Commission found proof of extensive bribery and the writ was suspended in 1844. The constituency was absorbed into West Suffolk.

Elections in the 1880s

Elections in the 1890s

Elections in the 1900s

Elections in the 1910s 

General Election 1914–15:

Another General Election was required to take place before the end of 1915. The political parties had been making preparations for an election to take place and by the July 1914, the following candidates had been selected; 
Unionist: Cuthbert Quilter
Liberal: Stephen Howard

  some records describe Hicks as an 'Agriculture' candidate

Elections in the 1920s 

compared to combined 1922 Liberal vote.

Elections in the 1930s

Elections in the 1940s 
General Election 1939–40:

Another General Election was required to take place before the end of 1940. The political parties had been making preparations for an election to take place from 1939 and by the end of this year, the following candidates had been selected; 
Conservative: Henry Burton
Liberal: Frederic Sellers
Labour: Roland Hamilton

References

Robert Beatson, A Chronological Register of Both Houses of Parliament (London: Longman, Hurst, Res & Orme, 1807) 
D Brunton & D H Pennington, Members of the Long Parliament (London: George Allen & Unwin, 1954)
Cobbett's Parliamentary history of England, from the Norman Conquest in 1066 to the year 1803 (London: Thomas Hansard, 1808) 
F W S Craig, British Parliamentary Election Results 1832–1885 (2nd edition, Aldershot: Parliamentary Research Services, 1989)
 
 Maija Jansson (ed.), Proceedings in Parliament, 1614 (House of Commons) (Philadelphia: American Philosophical Society, 1988) 
 H G Nicholas, To The Hustings: Election scenes from English fiction (London, Cassell & Co., 1956)

Parliamentary constituencies in Suffolk (historic)
Constituencies of the Parliament of the United Kingdom established in 1559
1844 disestablishments
Constituencies of the Parliament of the United Kingdom established in 1885
Constituencies of the Parliament of the United Kingdom disestablished in 1950
Parliamentary constituencies disenfranchised for corruption
Sudbury, Suffolk